"Long knives" was a term used by the Iroquois, and later by the Mingo and other indigenous peoples of the Ohio Country to designate white settlers from Virginia, in contradistinction to those of New York and Pennsylvania.

It is a literal translation of the treaty name that the Iroquois first bestowed on Governor Lord Howard in 1684, Assarigoe (variously spelled Assaregoa, Assaragoa, Asharigoua), meaning "cutlass" in Onondaga.  This word was chosen as a pun on Howard's name, which sounds like Dutch hower meaning "cutlass" (similar to the Iroquois' choice of the name Onas, or "quill pen", for the Pennsylvania Governors, beginning with William Penn.) This is the very explanation included within official diplomatic correspondence addressed by the Iroquois sachems themselves to then-governor Spotswood in 1722.

George Rogers Clark spoke of himself and men as "Big Knives" or Virginians, in his speeches to the Indians in 1778 after the capture of Illinois. In the latter part of the American Revolutionary War, down to and during the War of 1812, the term was used to designate "Americans".

References

 Dictionary of American History by James Truslow Adams, New York: Charles Scribner's Sons, 1940.
Chronicles of Border Warfare: "A history of whites and of the Indian Wars and Massacres", Alexander Scott Withers, 1831 p78-79.

Colony of Virginia
Native American history of Virginia
Exonyms
American Revolutionary War
War of 1812
Iroquois